USS Denver (LPD-9), an , was the third ship of United States Navy to bear this name. Denvers keel was laid on 7 July 1964 at Lockheed Shipbuilding and Construction Company, Seattle, Washington. She was launched on 23 January 1965, christened by Mrs. Ann Daniels Love, wife of John A. Love, the former governor of Colorado, and commissioned on 26 October 1968. After 46 years of service, Denver was decommissioned at Joint Base Pearl Harbor–Hickam on 14 August 2014. At the time of her decommissioning, Denver was the oldest deployable warship in the U.S. Navy, and was one of the last active warships to have served in Vietnam.

History

Vietnam War
In 1970, Denver played a key role in the SS Columbia Eagle incident. When Columbia Eagle was commandeered by two mutinous crew members on 14 March 1970, Denver was immediately dispatched to intercept and recapture Columbia Eagle. Denver never really caught up with Columbian Eagle, and sat outside the  limits of Cambodia (to where Columbia Eagle had been diverted) for a few days then departed the area.

In April 1975, Denver participated in Operation Frequent Wind, the evacuation of Saigon, South Vietnam.

Somalia Conflict 1993

Denver left her home port of San Diego on 3 September 1993 and deployed with 900 Marines and a platoon from Seal Team 5 to support operations in Somalia as part of United Nations Operation in Somalia II (UNOSOM II).

Collision with USNS Yukon
On 13 July 2000, the ship was participating in a refueling exercise near the end of a deployment. Denver, off the coast of Oahu, collided with its refueling vessel, . Denvers bow was seriously damaged. It remained in port at Pearl Harbor undergoing repairs for two weeks.

Typhoon Morakot
Beginning on 17 August 2009 Denver started rendering humanitarian assistance to Taiwan due to the destruction caused by Typhoon Morakot. Denver was tasked independently to render aid, led by Captain Donald Schmieley along with two embarked squadrons, HM-14 and HSC-25.

Cooperating closely with Taiwan Army and Air Force, they were supporting efforts by airlifting food, medical supplies, and providing heavy lift support for earth moving equipment to assist with recovery efforts. Due to the sensitive nature surrounding Taiwan, especially with the One China policy, the Department of Defense did not publicly announce relief efforts. Denver was planned to be in the vicinity of Taiwan until 22 August 2009 to render aid to the people of Taiwan. Denver had just completed the exercise Talisman Saber 2009 and was on her way to her homeport when she was directly tasked with this humanitarian mission.

2008 hull swap
In 2008 Denver replaced . The crew from Juneau took all relevant gear and documents from Juneau and transferred them to Denver. Denver was then home-ported at Sasebo Naval Base, Japan, where it would remain until being decommissioned.

2009 Sumatra earthquakes
Denver was sent to Sumatra to assist in the recovery efforts following the earthquakes there in September 2009.

2010
During the patrol, Denver took part in the 60th anniversary of the invasion of Incheon, Korea and assisted the Philippines in the wake of Typhoon Megi. On 17 November, Denver, Essex and Harpers Ferry became the first U.S. warships to visit Hong Kong's Victoria Harbour in more than two years.

2011
The ship departed Sasebo in September 2011 for a patrol of the western Pacific.

2012
In fall 2012, Denver departed for the 31st MEU fall patrol. During certification exercises around Guam, Denvers boilers suffered severe damage. After three weeks of repair at Guam, Denver left to continue patrol. Denver finished the patrol with limited power.

Decommissioning
Denver was decommissioned on 14 August 2014 at Joint Base Pearl Harbor–Hickam in Hawaii. She had been the oldest active duty ship in the US Navy behind . Upon Denvers decommissioning,  became the Navy's second oldest ship. The US government has offered to sell the ship to Malaysia to replace KD Sri Inderapura which was destroyed by fire in an incident in 2009.

The Navy announced that  would replace Denver in Sasebo in summer 2015.

She was hit by U.S. Navy F/A-18F Super Hornets long range anti-ship missile; United States Army AH-64 Apache helicopters shot air-to-ground Hellfire missiles, rockets, and 30 mm guns; and Marine Corps F/A-18C/D Hornets fired AGM-88 HARM missiles, followed by a Harpoon (AGM-84) missile, and JDAMs.

References

External links 

 
 
 USS Denver (LPD-9) command histories – Naval History & Heritage Command

Austin-class amphibious transport docks
Cold War amphibious warfare vessels of the United States
Vietnam War amphibious warfare vessels of the United States
Ships built by Lockheed Shipbuilding and Construction Company
1965 ships